Harold 'Harry' Millership (1889-1959) was a Welsh international footballer. He was part of the Wales national football team between 1920 and 1921, playing 6 matches. He played his first match on 14 February 1920 against Ireland and his last match on 9 April 1921 also against Ireland. At club level, he played for several clubs with Rotherham County being his most successful. He made 49 war-time guest appearances for Leeds City, scoring 6 goals in total. On 17 October 1919, an auction was held at the Metropole Hotel in Leeds, where the playing staff of Leeds was auctioned off along with other assets of the club. The 16 members of the playing squad were bought by 9 different clubs for a total of £9,250. Millership was bought by Rotherham County for £1,000, it was the second highest bid for a player. Billy McLeod was bought for £1,250 by Notts County.

See also
 List of Wales international footballers (alphabetical)

References

1889 births
1959 deaths
People from Chirk
Sportspeople from Wrexham County Borough
Welsh footballers
Wales international footballers
Leeds City F.C. players
Rotherham County F.C. players
Association football fullbacks